Official Secrets may refer to:

Official Secrets (film), a docudrama about a whistleblower leaking that the United States blackmailed the United Nations into supporting the Iraq War
"Official Secrets" (Yes, Prime Minister), the tenth episode of the TV series

See also
Official Secrets Act, a statute in several Commonwealth countries